Don Hall may refer to:

 Don Hall (ice hockey) (1930–2017), Canadian ice hockey player
 Don Hall (footballer) (1937–2018), Australian footballer
 Don Hall (filmmaker) (born 1969), American filmmaker
 Don Hall (sound editor), American sound editor
 Don C. Hall (1867–1953), American actor and politician